Harpadon nehereus, called the Bombay duck, bummalo, bombil, bombili, boomla, lote, loitta or লইট্যা or লোটে is a species of lizardfish.

Etymology

In the early days Bombay Duck caught in Bombay used to be discarded. However, this fish was considered a delicacy in Bengal. When the railways began their journey in India, this fish was transported from Bombay to Calcutta. Since they used to get transported in a mail train, the fish got its name Bombay Mail fish (shortened to Bombail or Bombil) or Bombay Daak (Daak is mail in Bengali). Some claim that this name was given by a British official (perhaps Robert Clive, mentioned later) who hated the overpowering smell of the fish in the train. 
According to local Bangladeshi stories, the term Bombay duck was first coined by Robert Clive, after he tasted a piece during his conquest of Bengal. He is said to have associated the pungent smell with that of the newspapers and mail which would come into the cantonments from Bombay. The term was later popularised among the British public by its appearance in Indian restaurants in the UK.

In his 1829 book of poems and "Indian reminiscences", Sir Toby Rendrag (pseudonym) notes the "use of a fish nick-named 'Bombay Duck'" and the phrase is used in texts as early as 1815.

Distribution and fisheries
The Bombay duck lives in the tropical areas of the Indo-Pacific. The fish is also known as "strange fish" because of its discontinuous distribution along the Indian coast. It has been traditionally caught in the waters off Maharashtra, Gujarat in the Lakshadweep Sea, where it is an important item of the yearly catch. This fish is also caught in the Bay of Bengal and in the South China Sea, although in smaller numbers.

The fish is sometimes dried, as well as dried and salted before it is consumed. After drying, the odour of the fish is extremely powerful, and it is usually transported in air-tight containers. The Bombay duck is a popular food item in certain areas of India particularly In Maharashtra. It is consumed as a dried fish in Sri Lanka, either tempered, fried or cooked as a curry. Fresh fish are usually fried as bombay duck fry, or cooked in curry,.

International availability 

At one time, 13 tonnes of Bombay duck were eaten in the UK each year. Following the discovery of a batch of imported seafood contaminated by Salmonella in 1996, the European Commission (EC) prohibited fish imports from India other than from approved freezing and canning factories. As Bombay duck is not produced in a factory, this had the unintended consequence of banning the import of Bombay duck. After a campaign to "Save Bombay Duck", the Indian High Commission approached the EC about the ban, and the EC adjusted its regulations so that the fish can still be dried in the open air, but has to be packed in an "EC approved" packing station. A Birmingham wholesale merchant located a packing source in Mumbai, and the product became available again.
Bombay duck is available fresh in Canada in cities with large Indian populations, such as Toronto and Montreal, and is generally known as bumla. Although mainly popular with Indians from Bengal, southern Gujarat, coastal Maharashtra, Goa, and Karnataka, it is increasingly consumed by the other South Asian populations, Sri Lankans and Bangladeshis in particular.

References

External links

Synodontidae
Fish of Bangladesh
Fish dishes
Culture of Mumbai
Fish described in 1822